Altaf Ahmed (born 25 October 1993) is a Pakistani first-class cricketer who plays for National Bank of Pakistan.

References

External links
 

1993 births
Living people
Pakistani cricketers
Habib Bank Limited cricketers
National Bank of Pakistan cricketers
Cricketers from Peshawar